Douglas Provincial Park is a provincial park in the Canadian province of Saskatchewan. Established in 1973, it is named after Tommy Douglas, the seventh premier of Saskatchewan and father of Canada's first single-payer, universal health care programme. The park is located along the Gordon McKenzie Arm of Lake Diefenbaker and at the Qu'Appelle River Dam, which is the source of the Qu'Appelle River. The closest community is Elbow and access to the park is from Highway 19.

Attractions to the park include access to Lake Diefenbaker, camping, hiking, and the Elbow Sand Hills. Less than 10 kilometres north of the park and just south of Elbow is Harbor Golf Club & Resort.

Attractions and amenities 
Located on the shores of Lake Diefenbaker, the largest body of water in southern Saskatchewan, Douglas Provincial Park has many recreational activities associated with the lake from swimming to boating to fishing. Inside the park there is a campground, hiking trails, picnic area, and sand dunes.

There are 150 campsites in total, 140 of which are electrified. Campground services include laundry facilities, potable water, washrooms / showers, sani-dump, convenience store, concession stand, and a fish cleaning station.

Douglas Provincial Park has two different trail systems–the Trans Canada Trail and the Dunes Nature Centre Trail. It winds its way around the campground through birch forests and flat prairie with views of Lake Diefenbaker. The Trans Canada Trail continues on out of the park and heads north for about 30 kilometres towards Danielson Provincial Park. The Dunes Nature Centre Trails system is made up of different trails that traverse different parts of the sand dunes.

Elbow Sand Hills 

The Elbow Sand Hills, and neighbouring Great Sand Hills, were formed about 12,000 years ago near the end of the last ice age. As the glaciers were retreating, they created proglacial lakes, spillways (South Saskatchewan Valley and Qu'Appelle Valley), and huge piles of sandy debris, glacial till, and moraines. This debris is what makes up the sand dunes.

Flora found in and around the dunes includes prairie grasses, western spiderworts, aspens, prickly pear cacti, and ball cacti.

See also 
List of protected areas of Saskatchewan
Geology of Saskatchewan
Geography of Saskatchewan
Tourism in Saskatchewan

References

External links 
Why are there sand dunes in the middle of Saskatchewan?
Douglas Provincial Park Sand Dunes

Provincial parks of Saskatchewan
Dunes of Canada
Hills of Saskatchewan
Landforms of Saskatchewan
Protected areas of Saskatchewan
Maple Bush No. 224, Saskatchewan
Huron No. 223, Saskatchewan